Artsana Group is an Italian company that was founded in 1946 by Pietro Catelli as a commercial business specialised in venipuncture and medication, and is still active today in the distribution of healthcare and infant care products. It is also noted for the manufacture of products for children.

Brands 
Since 1958, it has produced infant care products under the Chicco brand. The brand also manufactured toys. In 1987, while no injuries were reported, it voluntarily recalled the Pram Mobiles toy in the United States due to potential strangulation hazard to infants. Other notable toys include the Lullaby Play Gym, which was produced in collaboration with the Lerado company.

Other products include Pic Solution hypodermic syringes, and Control condoms, lubricants, and sex toys. Another brand that belongs to the Group is Prénatal (acquired in 1996).

Artsana Group is present in the principal countries of the world, often with companies set up locally. In the United States, for example, there is Artsana of America, Inc. Since 2018, the brand Recaro Kids is used by Artsana under license.

Distribution policy 
The headquarters are in Grandate (Como), Italy, where the main manufacturing plants are located. Artsana Group has 21 branches (12 in Europe) that are active throughout the world. There are six production units present in the European Union territory. The company also sources some of its products from China. One of its suppliers was the Zhili Company, which manufactures toy products for Chicco. Artsana agreed to pay a $180,000 compensation to fire victims after a fire razed a Zhili toy factory.

Taking into account all of the dealerships and distributors, the Artsana Group trades its brand in over 100 countries, while the points of sales, direct and franchising, for Chicco and Prénatal total approximately 400.

There are two business areas for the Group, Baby and Health Care, which gave a return of 87% and 13% respectively out of the 1,421 million Euros in turnover registered in 2015.

Sponsorships 
In 2012, the Artsana Group launched its Corporate Social Responsibility project under the PiC Solution brand. “Help with Pic."

In Italy Chicco supports Ai.Bi. Association – Amici dei Bambini - through "Seeds of Happiness for special children" project and on an international level, since 2013, the Mission Bambini Foundation has gotten the main branches of the Group (F – UK – B – CH – D – AR – RU – USA – ES ) involved in the “Happiness goes from heart to heart” project.

Area served 
As a tribute to its founder, Cavaliere del Lavoro Pietro Catelli, the company has sponsored the establishment of:
 a nursery school, il Villaggio dei Bambini, for children of Artsana employees in Grandate and in surrounding municipalities; 
 a preschool, Filomena Saldarini Catelli; 
 the Toy Horse Museum;
 a nursery school for children of employees at St Anna's Hospital in Como.

References

External links

Official Website

Pharmaceutical companies of Italy
Clothing companies of Italy
Toy companies of Italy
Pharmaceutical companies established in 1946
Toy companies established in 1946
Italian companies established in 1946
Companies based in Lombardy